KZD-85 is a  UAV system that was designed by Farner AG Grenchen. The aerospace enterprise RUAG Aviation is now responsible for it. KZD-85 stands for the German words “Klein Ziel Drohne” (small target drone).

Operation
The KZD-85 uses a compact launcher and a parachute-based landing system that enables the UAV to land nearly anywhere. Gliding landings on grass or snow are also possible. It is used as a training target (for aiming, but not shooting) for the Oerlikon 35 mm twin cannon, the FIM-92 Stinger, and the Rapier missile. There are no sensors built in; "hits" are determined by the surface reflection of the laser from the target device.

Operators

The KZD-85 system has been in service with the Swiss Air Force since 1985 and is still in use today. There are no plans for retiring or replacement.

Technical data 

Type: Target UAV
Range: up to

External links 

   Page of the Swiss Air Forces about the  KZD-85 in German language only
 Pictures and short english text about the KZD-85
 Jane's All the World's Aircraft, p. 418, and World unmanned aircraft, p. 73.

Unmanned aerial vehicles of Switzerland
RUAG aircraft
Articles containing video clips